The 2007 edition of the Women's Handball Tournament of the African Games was the 7th, organized by the African Handball Confederation and played under the auspices of the International Handball Federation, the handball sport governing body. The tournament ran from July 14−21 2007 in Algiers, Algeria, contested by 8 national teams and won by Angola.

Draw

Preliminary round

Group A

Group B

Knockout stage
7th place match

5th place match

Championship bracket

Final ranking

Awards

References

External links
 Official website

Handball at the 2007 All-Africa Games
Women's handball in Algeria
2007 in women's handball
Handball at the African Games